Estonia competed at the 2018 Winter Olympics in PyeongChang, South Korea from 9 to 25 February 2018. 

Estonian 15-year old freestyle-skier Kelly Sildaru, the gold medal favorite for the women’s ski slopestyle, missed the games due to an injury.

Competitors
The following is the list of number of competitors participating at the Games per sport/discipline.

Alpine skiing 

Based on the quota allocation of International Ski Federation, Estonia qualified 2 athletes.

Biathlon 

Based on their Nations Cup ranking in the 2016–17 Biathlon World Cup, Estonia has qualified 5 men and one woman on a quota for previously unqualified nations based on 2017–18 Biathlon World Cup standings. Johan Talihärm was selected as a reserve.

Cross-country skiing 

Estonia qualified 5 men and 2 women. Anette Veerpalu fell ill with a virus and was unable to compete.

Distance

Sprint

Nordic combined 

Based on the results of the 2016–17 and 2017–18 FIS Nordic Combined World Cup up to 21 January  2017, Estonia qualified two athletes.

Ski jumping 

Based on FIS Ski Jumping World Cup standings and Continental Cup Standings from seasons 2016/17 and 2017/18, Estonia qualified 3 male ski jumpers.

Speed skating

Estonia earned the following quotas at the conclusion of the four World Cup's used for qualification. The Estonian team consisted of one male and one female speed skater. This was the first games where an Estonian female speed skater competed. 

Individual

Mass start

References

Nations at the 2018 Winter Olympics
2018
Winter Olympics